Offleyhay is a village in Staffordshire, England. The population as taken at the 2011 census can be found under Eccleshall.

References

Villages in Staffordshire
Eccleshall